The World Allround Speed Skating Championships for Men took place on 13 and 14 February 1993 in Hamar at the Vikingskipet ice rink.

Title holder was the Italian Roberto Sighel.

Classification

 * = Fell
 DNS = Did not start
 DQ = Disqualified

Source:

References

World Allround Speed Skating Championships, 1993
1993 World Allround

Attribution
In Dutch